"Time After Time" is a song by British singer-songwriter Angel. It was first released in the United Kingdom on 29 November 2012 as the third single from his debut studio album About Time (2013). The song has peaked to number 41 on the UK Singles Chart and number 4 on the UK R&B Chart.

Music video
A music video to accompany the release of "Time After Time" was first released onto YouTube on 17 October 2012 at a total length of three minutes and forty-four seconds.

Track listing

Chart performance

Release history

References

Angel (British musician) songs
2012 singles
Songs written by Timothy Thomas
Songs written by Theron Thomas
Songs written by James Abrahart
2012 songs